Parcel post is a postal service for mail that is too heavy for normal letter post. It is usually slower than letter post. The development of the parcel post is closely connected with the development of the railway network which enabled parcels to be carried in bulk, to a regular schedule and at economic prices. Today, many parcels also travel by road and international shipments may travel by sea or airmail.

Development of domestic parcel posts
The idea of a parcel post may be credited to Germany, where the growth of railways had brought uniform postal rates throughout Germany and Austria in 1857. The practice of forwarding parcels with the mail, however, had been in use in Austria since the seventeenth century and in some German states is said to date to the fifteenth century. In the first year after the establishment of the domestic parcel post in Germany (1874), 38,862,654 parcels were carried, rising to 62,946,100 by 1881.

History

1881: Universal Postal Union agreement

The international parcel service, which allowed the orderly shipment of mailed packages and parcels from one country to another according to predetermined rates, was established by the Universal Postal Union on 1 October 1881 (Great Britain, India, The Netherlands and Persia, 1 April 1882), following the agreement of 1880 in Paris during a three-week conference on the subject. The service was difficult to introduce as in several countries the carriage of parcels was a monopoly of the railway companies, and Egypt, Great Britain, India, Canada and Italy all initially claimed that there was no parcel service in their country.

Great Britain and the Commonwealth 

The British domestic parcel post service was established on 1 August 1883. Commonwealth and foreign parcel post services were also established. The eight Australasian colonies (South Australia, Western Australia, New South Wales, Queensland, Victoria, Tasmania, New Zealand, British New Guinea and Fiji) and the other separate postal services of the colonies joined the UPU in 1891. By 1909/10, over 118 million parcels annually were being carried in the U.K., around 2.5% of which were international.

United States

The United States, as a signatory, started foreign parcel services in 1887 but did not institute domestic services until 1913.

The USPS, successor to the U.S. Post Office, officially ended International Parcel Post service in May 2007 after some 120 years of existence. International Parcel Post service was replaced by First-class Mail International service for parcels up to four pounds. For heavier parcels and/or printed matter, Priority Mail International, Priority Mail International Flat-Rate, Express Mail International, Airmail M-Bags, and Global Express Guaranteed service is available to foreign countries allowing these types of mail delivery.

USPS Domestic Parcel Post was an affordable method of sending large parcels of up to seventy pounds and a maximum combined length and girth of one hundred and thirty inches via ground transportation across the U.S. Effective January 27, 2013, the USPS renamed its parcel post service from 'Parcel Post' to 'Standard Post'. Effective January 17, 2016, the USPS renamed the service again, from "Standard Post" to "USPS Retail Ground", a name intended to resemble those of competing services UPS Ground and FedEx Ground.

Commercial Parcel Post service is now under the "Parcel Select" name.

Private couriers

Private couriers have existed since goods first needed to be transported from place to place. Before the development of state-run parcel posts, many stagecoach and railway companies had a thriving parcel service and private companies continue to run their own delivery networks today through firms like FedEx Express or DHL Express, even owning their own aircraft for long distance deliveries. Numerous smaller firms provide domestic and international courier services. Nowadays parcels often bear a barcode so they can be tracked at all the stages up to their reception by the final recipient.

Road transport services

Before the development of the railway network, road transport was the principal means of parcel transport. Services by road continued to thrive even during the railway age, including by bus, tram and trolley car.

Size limits
The size can range from a standard mail package to a box large enough to protect what is sent, up to a size that can be transported in a wheelbarrow. Nowadays parcels often bear a barcode so they can be tracked at all the stages up to their reception by the final recipient. A barcode is a unique ID number or code assigned to parcel when send it to the recipient. a barcode itself is reference for the parcel itself to locate a parcel in various points of parcel transit when it shipped as well as providing convenient information for the customer end receiver.

See also
 Bulletin d'expédition
 Charlotte May Pierstorff
 Package delivery
 Pryce Pryce-Jones
 Surface mail
 U.S. Parcel Post stamps of 1912-13
 Pigeon post
 Drone delivery

References

USPS Standard Post

Further reading 

Parcel post in foreign countries Washington: Government Printing Office, 1912, containing the text of the Convention for exchange of postal parcels of the International Postal Union.

 Stopford, M. (2009): Maritime economics, 3rd edition, Routledge.

Postal systems
Philatelic terminology